My Way  is the ninth Cantonese studio album by Hong Kong solo artist Shirley Kwan, released in 8 July 1994.

Track listing

References

Shirley Kwan albums
1994 albums